Dustin Nguyen (born Nguyễn Xuân Trí, September 17, 1962) is a Vietnamese American actor and martial artist. He is best known for his roles as Harry Truman Ioki on 21 Jump Street and as Johnny Loh on VIP. In film, he is known for starring in Little Fish, The Doom Generation and The Rebel.

Early life 
Nguyen was born Nguyễn Xuân Trí in Saigon, South Vietnam and was one of two sons in his family. His mother, My Le, was an actress and dancer, and his father, Xuân Phát, was an actor, comedian, writer, and producer in Vietnam. The family left Vietnam in April 1975 during the Fall of Saigon.

In his teens, his family arrived in Guam as refugees, and then the family was moved to a refugee camp in Fort Chaffee, Arkansas. Finally with the assistance of a Methodist church they relocated to Des Peres, Missouri, a suburb of St. Louis. After Nguyen graduated from Garden Grove High School in Garden Grove, CA, he attended Orange Coast College and majored in communications but later dropped out to pursue acting full time.

Nguyen practices several martial arts including Muay Thai, Tae Kwon Do, Eskrima, and Jeet Kune Do.

Career 
He made his acting debut on Magnum, P.I., portraying a Cambodian freedom fighter in the episode "All For One." He was a cast member on both 21 Jump Street and VIP, and has guest-starred on a number of other series, including General Hospital, Highlander, and most notably seaQuest DSV, playing the role of Chief William Shan. Moreover, he played a cameo role in Charlie's Angels. Nguyen also auditioned for the role of Liu Kang in Mortal Kombat, but lost out to Robin Shou. In 1993 he played a Vietnamese man sent off to fight with the Viet Cong, in the film Heaven & Earth. In 2005, Nguyen starred as a former heroin addict opposite Academy Award-winner Cate Blanchett in the critically acclaimed Little Fish. He starred in the 2007 films The Rebel and Saigon Eclipse. In 2008 he starred in the Vietnamese martial art film Huyen Thoai Bat Tu (The Legend Is Alive, The Immortal Legend) where he plays a mentally disabled martial artist. Nguyen screened in 2009 the thriller The Gauntlet directed by Matt Eskandari; he stars with Chinese actress Bai Ling. He made a small cameo in 22 Jump Street as Vietnamese Jesus.

Nguyen continues to act and make films in Vietnam full-time. He made his feature directorial debut in the Vietnamese fantasy film Once Upon a Time in Vietnam, in which he also starred. He then starred in the Vietnamese film Gentle that premiered at the 2015 Busan International Film Festival where he received strong reception for his performance.

He was cast in Cinemax's Warrior in a recurring role before he officially joined the main cast in season two of the series.

Nguyen also was cast in The Accidental Getaway Driver which premiered at the 2023 Sundance Film Festival.

Personal life 
After a car accident late at night that occurred on September 3, 2001, on California's Interstate 5 Highway between San Francisco and Los Angeles during a Labor Day weekend that left his wife (Angela Rockwood) a quadriplegic, Nguyen and his wife became active in The Christopher and Dana Reeve Paralysis Resource Center. The accident also claimed the life of Vietnamese actress Thuy Trang, a member of the original cast of Mighty Morphin Power Rangers as the original Yellow Ranger, Trini.  He and Rockwood divorced in 2012.

Nguyen is based in Vietnam full-time. In 2012, he married Vietnamese actress-model Bebe Pham with whom he has two daughters, born in 2013 and 2015.

He is fluent in English and Vietnamese.

Filmography

Film

Television

Producer 
A Tourist's Guide to Love (2023)– Consulting Producer

CinemAbility (2011) (filming) – Himself
The Amazing Race Vietnam (2012) – Himself
2007 AZN Asian Excellence Awards (2007) – Himself
The Slanted Screen (2006) – Himself
"E! True Hollywood Story" – Himself (1 episode, 2004)
"Howard Stern" – Himself (4 episodes, 1999)
"The Howard Stern Radio Show" – Himself (2 episodes, 1999)
"Intimate Portrait" – Himself (1 episode)

Awards 
In March 2009, Nguyen won the Vietnamese Cánh Diều Vàng (Golden Kite Award) for best actor, for his starring role in the Phuoc Sang Films vehicle Huyền Thoại Bất Tử (The Legend Is Alive).
For the same role, that year he won a Golden Lotus Award (Vietnam's Oscar) for Best Actor. He also won China's Golden Rooster Award for Best International Actor at China's Golden Rooster and Thousand Flowers International Film Festival 2009.

In 2015, at the Milan International Film Festival, Dustin won the Leonardo da Vinci Golden Horse Award for Best Supporting Actor in the Vietnamese film GENTLE; an adaptation of Fyodor Dostoevsky's A GENTLE CREATURE."

References

External links 

1962 births
20th-century American male actors
21st-century American male actors
Living people
People from Ho Chi Minh City
Vietnamese expatriates in the United States
American male film actors
American male television actors
Male actors from California
American male taekwondo practitioners
Vietnamese male taekwondo practitioners
American Jeet Kune Do practitioners
Male actors from St. Louis
Vietnamese emigrants to the United States
Vietnamese male television actors
Vietnamese male film actors
American film actors of Vietnamese descent
Male actors of Vietnamese descent
21st-century Vietnamese male actors
20th-century Vietnamese male actors